Sepidrood Rasht Sport Club (Bashgah-e Vârzeshi-ye Sipidrod Resht) is an Iranian football club based in Rasht, Iran. They currently compete in the third flight League 2.

Sepidrood competes against Malavan in the El Gilano and also has a friendly rivalry with cross-city rival Damash Gilan.

History

Establishment
Sepidrood Rasht Football Club is one of the oldest clubs in northern Iran founded in 1968 and is the first sports club to be based in Rasht. The team was named after the Sefīd-Rūd river which runs through the area. Sepidrood became champions of the Gilan Provincial League after the revolution three times, in 1983, 1986 and in 2003.

Lower Leagues
On 15 May 2010, Sepidrood secured promotion and thus played in the Azadegan League in the 2010–11 season for the first time in eleven years, however, the club was relegated at the end of the season.

In 2014 Despite relegating to 3rd Division, Sepidrood bought Shahrdari Langarud license and remained in Second Division. After a good 2015–16 season in which Sepidrood made the last round of the 2nd Division, the team were promoted after finishing first in Group B.

Promotion to the top flight
Sepidrood started the 2016–17 season in the Azadegan League excellently, and at the halfway point of the season they were leading the league. On the second last match day of the season, Sepidrood lost to third place team Gol Gohar Sirjan 3–2 and their promotion to the top flight came into serious danger. However, on 1 May 2017 Sepidrood defeated Nassaji Mazandaran 3–2 and were promoted to the Persian Gulf Pro League and the top flight of Iranian football for the first time in their 49 year history.

Colours and badge
Since its founding, the club colors have been red and white. Sepidrood is known by its fans as the Red Army.

Owner
The owner of the club is Javad Tanzadeh (an Iranian businessman).

Honours
Azadegan League (Persian Gulf Pro League promotion) 
Runners-up (1): 2016–17

Aga Khan Gold Cup
Winners (1): 1977

El Gilano

The match between Sepidrood or Damash and Malavan is known as The Derby Of Gilan or El Gilano. This derby is one of Iran's most important and heated derbies.

Players

First-team squad
As of 31 July 2020

Reserves

Season-by-season
For details on seasons, see List of Sepidrood Rasht F.C. seasons

{|class="wikitable"
|-bgcolor="#efefef"
!Season
! League
! Position
!Iranian Hazfi Cup
! Notes
|-
|align=center|2004–05
| rowspan="6" align="center" |League 2
|align=center|6th (Group 1)
|-
|align=center|2005–06
|align=center|5th (Group A)
|rowspan="2" align="center" |did not participate
|
|-
|align=center|2006–07
|align=center|13th (Group 2)
|align=center|Relegated
|
|-
|align=center|2007–08
|align=center|3rd  (Group B)
|align=center|Second round 
|
|-
|align=center|2008–09
|align=center|4th (1st round - Group D)
|align=center|Second round 
|
|-
|align=center|2009–10
|align=center style="text-align:center; background:#dfd;"|1st
|align=center|First stage
|align=center|Promoted
|-
|align=center|2010–11
|align=center|Azadegan League
|align=center style="text-align:center; background:#fcc;"|14th
|align=center|Round of 32
|align=center|Relegated
|-
|align=center|2011–12
| rowspan="5" align="center" |League 2
|align=center|10th (Group A)
|rowspan="2" align="center" |did not participate
|align=center|
|-
|align=center|2012–13
|align=center|4th (Group B)
|
|-
|align=center|2013–14
|align=center|12th (Group B)
|align=center|First stage
|align=center|Relegated
|
|-
|align=center|2014–15
|align=center|3rd (2nd round - Group B)
|align=center|First stage
|
|-
|align=center|2015–16
|align=center style="text-align:center; background:#dfd;"|1st (2nd round - Group B)
| rowspan="2" align="center" |did not participate
|align=center|Promoted
|-
|align=center|2016–17
|align=center|Azadegan League
|align=center style="text-align:center; background:#dfd;"|2nd
|align=center|Promoted
|-
|align=center|2017–18
| rowspan="2" align="center" |Persian Gulf Pro League
|align=center|13th
|align=center|Round of 32
|align=center|
|-
|align=center|2018–19
|align=center style="text-align:center; background:#fcc;"|15th
|align=center|Round of 16
|align=center|Relegated
|-
|align=center|2019–20
|align=center|Azadegan League
|align=center style="text-align:center; background:#fcc;"|17th
| rowspan="2" align="center" |did not participate
|align=center|Relegated
|-
|align=center|2020–21
| rowspan="2" align="center" |League 2
|align=center|7th (Group A)
|align=center|
|-
|}

Famous players
Mohammad Reza Mahdavi
Reza Niknazar
Soheil Haghshenas
Hossein Kaebi

References

External links
  

 
Association football clubs established in 1968
1968 establishments in Iran